Lilienthal Berlin is a German watch manufacturer based in the German capital Berlin.

Lilienthal Berlin was founded in 2015 by Jacques Colman and Michael Gilli. The company name refers to the German aviation pioneer Otto Lilienthal. The Lilienthal watches are inspired by the Bauhaus design. The company focuses on marketing through the internet.

The Lilienthal 1 model was awarded the German Design Award and the iF Design Award.
In 2017, Lilienthal received the Green Product Award for its sustainability concept. The model Zeitgeist Automatik "All Black" won the title "Watch of the Year" in 2020.
Lilienthal Berlin also received the German Design Award in 2019 and 2020 consecutively as well as the Red Dot Design Award in 2019.

References

External links 
Lilienthal Berlin, official website

Watch brands
Manufacturing companies established in 2015
Watch manufacturing companies of Germany
Manufacturing companies based in Berlin
German brands